Yeom Dong-gyun (born 3 November 1983) is a former South Korean football goalkeeper.

He spent most of his career playing for Chunnam Dragons and was a part of the national team by 10 October 2008.

Match-fixing
On 24 January 2011, Yeom joined Jeonbuk Hyundai Motors on a three-year contract, but was released for his involvement in an alleged match-fixing scandal five months later. He admitted that he had involved in match-fixing and accepted a bribe a year ago.

Honours

Chunnam Dragons
FA Cup (2): 2006, 2007

References

External links

1983 births
Living people
South Korean footballers
Jeonnam Dragons players
Gimcheon Sangmu FC players
Jeonbuk Hyundai Motors players
K League 1 players

Association football goalkeepers
South Korean Buddhists